"Believer" is the debut single by American indie rock band American Authors. The song was written by band members Zac Barnett, Dave Rublin, Matt Sanchez, and James Adam Shelley, along with producers Aaron Accetta and Shep Goodman. "Believer" first appeared on their 2013 American Authors EP and was released as the band's debut single on March 19, 2013; it was later included on their debut studio album, Oh, What a Life (2014).

Release
"Believer" initially garnered airplay on United States modern rock radio in early 2013, and was later re-released to modern rock, triple A, hot adult contemporary and mainstream radio following the success of the band's second single "Best Day of My Life". A remix of the song by Dutch DJ Tiësto was issued as a digital single on July 22, 2014.
There is an accompanying music video that shows two boys working together to build a time machine

Track listing
Digital download
 "Believer" – 3:04

Digital download (remix)
 "Believer" (Tiësto Remix) – 3:35

Personnel
Adapted from Oh, What a Life liner notes.

American Authors
 Zac Barnett – lead vocals, guitar
 James Adam Shelley – lead guitar, banjo, backing vocals
 Dave Rublin – bass guitar, backing vocals
 Matt Sanchez – drums, backing vocals

Technical personnel
 Aaron Accetta – production
 Michael Goodman – production

Charts

Weekly charts

Year-end charts

Certifications

Release history

References

2013 songs
2013 debut singles
Mercury Records singles
American Authors songs
Song recordings produced by Aaron Accetta
Songs written by Aaron Accetta
Songs written by Shep Goodman